Glasnost refers to a 1980s Soviet policy  that called for increased openness and transparency in government institutions and activities.

Glasnost may also refer to:
 Glasnost (album), a 2011 album by alternative metal band Illuminatus
 The Glasnost Bowl, an attempt in 1989 to schedule a U.S. college football game to be played in Moscow